Darby and Joan is an Australian murder mystery, crime comedy-drama television series starring Bryan Brown and Greta Scacchi. The series was announced in 2021 and began streaming on Acorn TV from 8 August 2022. The eight part series was created by Glenys Rowe and Phillip Gwynne and filmed in Queensland across the Gold Coast, Scenic Rim, Redland City, North Stradbroke Island, Mount Isa and Cairns.

Synopsis
A retired Australian detective and an English nurse work together to solve the mystery of her husband's recent death.

Cast
 Greta Scacchi as Joan Kirkhope
 Bryan Brown as Jack Darby
 Caroline Gillmer as Denise

Episodes

References

External links
 Acorn TV
 

2020s Australian television series
2022 Australian television series debuts
Australian mystery television series
Australian comedy-drama television series
English-language television shows
Television shows set in Queensland